Bilsthorpe Moor is a hamlet in the civil parish of Bilsthorpe, in the Newark and Sherwood district of Nottinghamshire, England. It is 120 miles north of London, 13 miles north east of the city of Nottingham, and 5 miles south of Ollerton, and close to the junction of the A614 and A617 roads.

Toponymy 
The name "Bilsthorpe" means 'The þorp (village) of Bildr''', or more Scandinavian, Bildi.'' Little knowledge on either person exists. The moor portion of the placename refers to its development on moorland.

Geography 
Bilsthorpe Moor is surrounded by the following local areas:

 Bilsthorpe village to the north
 Farnsfield to the south
 Eakring and Kirklington to the east
 Mansfield and Rainworth to the west.

This area lies to the southeast corner of the parish, where Kirklington Road meets Farnsfield Road. It also refers to the wider location south of built-up area, for which there are open fields to the east, west and south which is predominantly used as farmland, with some light and medium industry.

Governance and demography 
The two settlements Bilsthorpe and Bilsthorpe Moor form one unified built-up area.

This and the wider countryside are combined as Bilsthorpe parish for administrative identity.

This parish reports a population of 3,375 residents.

It is managed at the first level of public administration by Bilsthorpe Parish Council.

At district level, the wider area is managed by Newark and Sherwood District Council.

Nottinghamshire County Council provides the highest level strategic services locally.

History 
In 1066 during the time of the Norman Conquest, Ulf was recorded as local lord and landowner. By the time of Domesday (1086), Gilbert of Ghent was the primary landowner. Much of the surrounding area came into the ownership by the sixteenth century of Sir Brian Broughton, first in the line of Broughton baronets. It was later transferred to the Earl of Scarborough by the middle of the 19th century, who was recorded as Lord of the manor in 1853 as well as owner of all the parish land, except the glebe land associated to the village church. Bilsthorpe Moor was first recorded in 1840 within a tithe map as a discrete place.

Maps at the turn of the 20th century showed a cluster of residences as well as a small pool, the Sow Dam (by the modern day Oaktree Drive) as the northern extent of the hamlet, with some greenfield land before Bilsthorpe village. This gap began to be built over from the late 1950s into the 1970s mainly with housing, mirroring the building of miner's homes taking place in the main village, with a small retail area put in place along this section of Kirkington Road. The railway line to Bilsthorpe colliery ran to the left of the village, and was in use for transporting coal from the middle 1920s until 1997.

There was a school in the area for much of the 20th century. By the middle of the 1950s there was a medium-sized farm to the north east of the village, eventually becoming a factory for poultry products owned by Deans Foods, which was later was bought out by the Noble Foods Group. It was closed in 2016, with production moved elsewhere in the country, and the facility subsequently demolished. The owners then made proposals to build houses on the site. Wicker (later Wycar) Leys was a large farmhouse on the southwest of the area, which was owned by the Rufford Abbey estate until 1938 when much of their local holdings were sold. It was later repurposed as a nursing home for disabled patients until the parent business closed the site in 2019.

Economy 
While much of the area surrounding the residential settlement is agricultural with nearby farms working the land, there is other industry locally based to the south of the village:

 Belle Eau Park is an industrial estate for small and medium businesses, with a small portion within the moor area.
 There is a wood manufacturer providing business furnishings.
 A solar farm is to the south west, feeding generated electricity into the national grid.

Landmarks

Tourist sites 

 The Southwell Trail reuses the former railway trackbed to the Bilsthorpe colliery as a medium distance path.
 An activity centre is close to the junction of the A614 and A617 roads.

References 

Hamlets in Nottinghamshire
Bilsthorpe